Daulatpur railway station is located in Dakshin Dinajpur district in the Indian state of West Bengal. It serves Daulatpur village and the surrounding areas. Daulatpur station was built in 2004. A few trains, like the Gour Express, – passenger trains stop at Daulatpur railway station.

References

Railway stations in Dakshin Dinajpur district
Railway stations opened in 2004
Katihar railway division